Mariano Sánchez de Loria (24 September 1774–2 August 1842) was a Bolivian-born statesman and lawyer. He was a representative to the Congress of Tucumán which on 9 July 1816 declared the Independence of Argentina.

Sánchez de Loria was born in Chuquisaca and gained his doctorate in jurisprudence and canonical laws at the university there. He backed the idea of an Incan constitutional monarchy for the United Provinces of the River Plate.

After the Congress moved to Buenos Aires, Sánchez de Loria continued his work there. Around 1817 his wife died and he returned to his hometown and was ordained a priest, becoming a canon at Charcas Cathedral. When he died he was a priest at Tacobamba in Potosí.

References
Profile by the House of Tucumán

1774 births
1842 deaths
18th-century Bolivian lawyers
Members of the Congress of Tucumán
People from Chuquisaca Department
Argentine monarchists
19th-century Bolivian lawyers